is a 2004 Japanese film by director Minoru Kawasaki, starring Kana Ishida and Osamu Nishimura.

Plot
The plot revolves around a professional wrestler who, after developing a terminal illness, becomes a giant squid-like creature (Osamu Nishimura).  As a giant squid, he must battle to reclaim his former life both inside and outside the ring.

Cast
 Kana Ishida as Miyako		
 Osamu Nishimura as Kanichi Iwata/The Calamari Wrestler
 Akira Nogami as Koji Taguchi/The Octopus Wrestler
 Hirohisa Nakata as Godozan/The Squilla Boxer
 Miho Shiraishi as Sister
 Yoshihiro Takayama as himself
 Hariken Ryu as Calamari Wrestler's suit actor

Reception
Jeannett Catsoulis of The New York Times described the film as goofy and bizarre "yet surprisingly coherent" with "a good-natured charm." Catsoulis commented on the themes of the film noting a "convincing parallel between the anxieties of post-World War II Japan and what the film calls the "utter chaos" of the country today."

References

External links

 (Japanese)

Professional wrestling films
2000s sports comedy films
2004 films
2000s Japanese-language films
Films about cephalopods
Films directed by Minoru Kawasaki
Fictional squid
Discotek Media
2004 comedy films
2000s English-language films
2000s Japanese films